Cimarron is a 1981 Emmylou Harris album that, like its predecessor, Evangeline, was composed mostly of outtakes from other recording sessions that had not fit into any of Harris' other albums.  As a result, critics at the time complained that the album was "choppy" and lacked a unifying sound.  Nonetheless, the album did well on the U.S. country charts, and featured three top-ten country singles: "Born to Run" (not to be confused with the Bruce Springsteen song of the same name), "If I Needed You" (a duet with Don Williams), and "Tennessee Rose."  It was nominated for a Grammy in 1982 for Best Country Vocal Performance, Female. In 2000, Eminent Records issued Cimarron for the first time on CD (it had been out of print since the late 1980s), with new liner notes and a bonus track, "Colors of Your Heart."

Track listing

Personnel 
Brian Ahern - Acoustic Guitar, Electric Guitar, 6-String Bass, Ernie Ball Bass, Percussion
Joe Allen - Electric Bass
Mike Bowden - Bass
Tony Brown - Piano, Electric Piano
Barry Burton - Acoustic Guitar
James Burton - Electric Guitar
Charles Cochran - Electric Piano
Donivan Cowart - Backing Vocals
Rodney Crowell: Acoustic Guitar
Hank DeVito - Pedal Steel
Steve Fishell - Acoustic Hawaiian Guitar, Percussion, Pedal Steel
Wayne Goodwin - Fiddle, Mandolin
Emory Gordy Jr. - Bass, Electric Bass
Glen Hardin - Piano, Electric Piano, String Arrangements
Emmylou Harris - Vocals, Acoustic Guitar, Backing Vocals
Don Johnson - Electric Piano
Paul Kennerley - Acoustic Guitar
David Kirby - Acoustic Guitar
Albert Lee - Mandolin
Kenny Malone - Drums, Conga
Herb Pedersen - Banjo, Backing Vocals
Mickey Raphael - Harmonica
Frank Reckard - Electric Guitar, Gut-String Guitar
Ricky Skaggs - Banjo, Fiddle, Backing Vocals
Buddy Spicher - Viola
Fayssoux Starling - Duet Vocals, Backing Vocals
Barry Tashian - Acoustic Guitar, Electric Guitar, Backing Vocals
John Ware - Drums
Cheryl White - Backing Vocals
Sharon White - Backing Vocals
Don Williams - Duet Vocals

Technical personnel
Brian Ahern - Producer, Engineer
Donivan Cowart - Engineer
Garth Fundis - Producer (3)
Stuart Taylor - Engineer
Don Williams - Producer (3)

Charts

Weekly charts

Year-end charts

References

Emmylou Harris Cimarron liner notes

Emmylou Harris albums
1981 albums
Albums produced by Brian Ahern (producer)
Warner Records albums